
Serrana may refer to:

Places
 Serrana, São Paulo, a city in Brazil
 Serrana (Santa Catarina), a mesoregion in Brazil
 Serrana Bank, an atoll off the coast of Colombia

Organisms
 Clystea serrana, a moth of family Erebidae
 Cochylis serrana, a moth of family Tortricidae
 Cupanoscelis serrana, a beetle of family Cerambycidae
 Geocerthia serrana, a bird of family Furnariidae
 Justicia serrana, a plant of family Acanthaceae
 Neocompsa serrana, a beetle of family Cerambycidae
 Potiatuca serrana, a beetle of family Cerambycidae
 Vriesea serrana, a plant of family Bromeliaceae

People
 Serrana Fernández (born 1973), Uruguayan swimmer
 Elisa Serrana (1930–2012), Chilean writer

Other uses
 Serrana (composition), a solo guitar etude by Jason Becker